Sergio Pelegrín López (born 18 April 1979) is a Spanish former professional footballer who played as a central defender, currently a manager.

He played 260 Segunda División games during his career, totalling 15 goals for Salamanca, Rayo Vallecano, Elche (two spells) and Alavés. In La Liga, he appeared for the third club.

Club career
Born in Barcelona, Catalonia, Pelegrín spent until the age of 28 playing in the Segunda División B, where he represented RCD Espanyol B, RCD Mallorca B, Deportivo Aragón, Girona FC and Alicante CF. For the first team of the first and second clubs, he appeared in two official games apiece, in both cases in the UEFA Intertoto Cup. 

Subsequently, Pelegrín moved to Segunda División, appearing for UD Salamanca, Rayo Vallecano and Elche CF. He scored a career-best four goals in 28 games in the 2011–12 season, then started in all his 35 league appearances the following campaign as the Valencian Community side returned to La Liga after 24 years.

Pelegrín became the oldest player to make his debut in the Spanish top flight on 4 November 2013 at age 34, coming on as a second-half substitute in a 0–1 home loss against Villarreal CF. On 30 June 2015, he signed a one-year deal with Deportivo Alavés in the second tier.

On 30 June 2016, after achieving another top-division promotion, Pelegrín left Alavés as his contract expired and returned to his former club Elche. He retired the following year at the age of 38, and joined Getafe CF's coaching staff under José Bordalás.

Coaching career
In March 2019, Pelegrín took up the role of head coach at Elche CF Ilicitano. He was fired on 11 March 2020 after a poor run of results.

Pelegrín joined Sergio Mora's staff at Hércules CF on 15 July 2021.

Managerial statistics

Honours
Elche
Segunda División: 2012–13

Alavés
Segunda División: 2015–16

References

External links

1979 births
Living people
Spanish footballers
Footballers from Barcelona
Association football defenders
La Liga players
Segunda División players
Segunda División B players
RCD Espanyol B footballers
RCD Espanyol footballers
RCD Mallorca B players
RCD Mallorca players
Real Zaragoza B players
Girona FC players
Alicante CF footballers
UD Salamanca players
Rayo Vallecano players
Elche CF players
Deportivo Alavés players
Spain youth international footballers
Spanish football managers
Tercera División managers
Elche CF Ilicitano managers